Village-Saint-Augustin is a small community in Weldford Parish located 3.16 km NE of Adamsville, on the road to Beersville. It is included in both Harcourt Parish and Weldford Parish, now in the Parish of Harcourt, the area is now home to a few Acadian families.

History

Village-Saint-Augustin had a Post Office 1912-1951. At one time it included the settlement of Adamsville East

Notable people

See also
List of communities in New Brunswick

References

Settlements in New Brunswick
Communities in Kent County, New Brunswick